Burney may refer to:


Places
 Burney, California, United States, an unincorporated town and census-designated place
 Burney, Indiana, United States, an unincorporated community
 Burney Falls, a waterfall in California
 Burney (hill), hill in Cumbria, England
 Burney Peak, Nelson Island, Antarctica
 Burney (crater), on the planet Pluto
 6235 Burney, an asteroid

People
 Burney (surname)
 Burney Lamar (born 1980), American stock car racing driver

Other uses
 Burney baronets, a title in the Baronetage of the United Kingdom
 Burney Cars, the better-known name of Streamline Cars Ltd
 Burney Collection, an extensive British Library collection of 17th–18th century newspapers
 Burney guns, recoilless rifles designed by Sir Charles Dennistoun Burney

See also
 Bernie (disambiguation)
 Burnie (disambiguation)